Civil Lines (archaically White Town) are the residential neighbourhoods developed during the British Raj for its senior civilian officers like Divisional commissioner and District magistrate. These townships were built all over the Indian subcontinent and were allotted to civil officers in the respective countries. This is distinct from Forts and Cantonments, which were expressedly military establishments.

These include:

In India
 Civil Lines, Delhi
 Civil Lines, Prayagraj
 Civil Lines, Kanpur
 Civil Lines, Ajeetpur nai Basti Rmp 
 Civil Lines, Jaipur
 Civil Lines, Roorkee
 Civil Lines, Jhansi
 Civil Lines, Jhansi
 Civil Lines, Bareilly
 Civil Lines, Jabalpur

In Pakistan

 Civil Lines, Rawalpindi
 Civil Lines, Faisalabad
 Civil Lines, Karachi
 Civil Lines, Lahore

References

Types of towns
Urban studies and planning terminology